RSH may mean:

The former NYSE stock symbol for RadioShack
Regulator of Social Housing
Remote shell, a UNIX command-line utility for remotely executing commands
Restricted shell, a restricted shell environment for Unix
Robert Stephenson and Hawthorns, a locomotive manufacturer
Rogers Stirk Harbour + Partners, a British architectural firm 
Royal South Hampshire Hospital in Southampton
Royal Shrewsbury Hospital in Shrewsbury
The graffiti tag of artist Raymond Salvatore Harmon
R-SH, within organic chemistry, the notation used for a compound also known as Thiol
 The Russian Mission Airport in Alaska, United States